Richard Gordon Guindon (December 2, 1935 – February 27, 2022) was an American cartoonist best known for his gag panel Guindon. Guindon's cartoons have appeared in the Minneapolis Tribune, The Realist, and the Detroit Free Press.

Biography

During the late 1950s, Guindon attended the University of Minnesota, where he drew cartoons for The Minnesota Daily, as recalled by Stan Gotlieb:

Living in New York City during the early 1960s, Guindon began contributing to The Nation, Playboy, Esquire and Down Beat. He also drew cartoons for Paul Krassner's The Realist and was associated with Krassner's class at the Free School. Guindon's best known work from the 1960s was published in The Realist, which included adult-themed references to politics and current events of the time.

Leaving New York, Guindon returned to Minnesota, where Mpls.St.Paul Magazine said in its "Encyclopedia Minnesotica" that Guindon is "Minnesota's greatest satirist".

In 1981, Guindon moved from Minnesota to work in Michigan for the Detroit Free Press, which issued a 1984 datebook, Guindon's Detroit. In May 1984, he made an appearance on The Tonight Show Starring Johnny Carson. He had a three-month art exhibition, "Richard Guindon, 1981–1984", at the Flint Institute of Arts from March 10 to May 26, 1985. That same year, he took an extended vacation, continuing to draw his cartoons while driving around Europe.

Guindon began his self-titled cartoon series for the Minneapolis Tribune in 1974. At first it appeared three to four times per week, then became a daily in 1978 when it was picked up by the Los Angeles Times Syndicate. In 1981, the syndication was moved to Field Newspaper Syndicate, and then in 1984 to News America Syndicate. The syndication of the panel appears to have ended in 1985, but the cartoon may have survived as a feature of the Detroit Free Press until later, perhaps 1987.

When he returned to the United States, he moved to Traverse City, Michigan in March 1986, and the following August he set up his studio in the Masonic Hall building in downtown Traverse City with a third-floor view of Grand Traverse Bay. Eight months later, the historic four-story building was destroyed by fire. "I've lost 30-some years of work", said Guindon. "It's funny this building should wait 97 years for me to move into it before burning. It really hasn't hit me yet. I think tomorrow is going to be a very grim day." More than 5,000 cartoons and sketches burned in the April 1987 fire, but a few weeks later Guindon learned that Irv Letofsky, Sunday editor of the Los Angeles Times "Calendar" section, had saved a copy of every Guindon cartoon syndicated over a decade.

In 1988, Guindon broke out of the single-panel mold and began a multi-panel comic strip, The Carp Chronicles, commenting, "Nothing ever works out in Carp City. I don't know why. They're very nice people. It's not a pretty story, but it has to be told."

Guindon announced his retirement in 2005 and lived in Northern Michigan in the village of Suttons Bay in his later years. 

Guindon died in Northport, Michigan, on February 27, 2022, at the age of 86.

Bibliography

Guindon's cartoons have been collected in several books: 
Guindon (Minneapolis Tribune, 1977),
Cartoons by Guindon (Putnam's/Quick Fox, 1980),
The World According to Carp (Andrews McMeel, 1983),
Together Again (Andrews McMeel, 1986)
Michigan So Far (Detroit Free Press, 2003)

References

External links
The Realist Archive Project
The Richard Guindon official site, archived from the original on 11 May 2018.
The Education of a Comics Artist: Visual Narrative in Cartoons, Graphic Novels, and Beyond by Michael Patrick Dooley and Steven Heller
 "Richard Guindon, quirky and satirical former Free Press cartoonist, dies at 86," by Patty LaNoue Stearns, Feb. 28, 2022, Detroit Free Press

1935 births
2022 deaths
American comic strip cartoonists
American comics artists
American humorists
Artists from Saint Paul, Minnesota
University of Minnesota alumni